Isle du Bois Creek is a stream in Jefferson and Ste. Genevieve counties of the U.S. state of Missouri. It is a tributary of the Mississippi River.

At this point it becomes the boundary between the two counties and meanders to the east and northeast. The stream passes under I-55 and US Route 61 approximately 1.5 miles south of the community of Danby.

Isle du Bois is a name derived from the French denoting "isle of the woods".

See also
List of rivers of Missouri

References

Rivers of Jefferson County, Missouri
Rivers of Ste. Genevieve County, Missouri
Rivers of Missouri